PowWow365, designed and developed by Hirasoft Corp, is a web conferencing application for businesses and organizations, allowing them to host and attend their meetings, conferences, trainings or workshops from anywhere around the world. The application allows both standard types of communications, i-e, real-time Point-to-point communications and multicast from one sender to the many receivers.

Overview

PowWow365 is complemented by (SSL) with Advanced Encryption Standard AES 256-bit encryption data transfer, which makes it quite reliable and efficient solution for synchronous conferencing at enterprise levels. It introduces the features such as host or invite, chat or call, save and share meeting media to the participants in a neat and clean interface. However, it is this app's integration to WebRTC which supports and enables contextual communications in simultaneous and synchronous fashion during meetings and training sessions.

Features of a PowWow365 include:

 Slideshow presentations - where files and documents are presented to the participants along with markup tools to discuss slides content in an interactive fashion.
 Voice over IP - Real time audio communication using group of internet technologies, speakers allowing speakers to engage with meeting participants with conference calls.
 File Sharing – Pre-meeting, post-meeting and during meeting documents (meeting literature) to make meetings more informative and productive
 Web tours - where URLs, data from forms, cookies, scripts and session data can be pushed to other participants enabling them to be pushed through web based logons, clicks, etc. This type of feature works well when demonstrating websites where users themselves can also participate.
 Meeting Recording - where presentation activity is recorded on the client side or server side for later viewing and/or distribution.
 Whiteboards - with markup tools for annotation (allowing the presenter and/or attendees to highlight or mark items on the slide presentation. Or, simply make notes on a blank whiteboard.)
 Instant Messaging - For live question and answer sessions, limited to the people connected to the meeting. Text chat may be public (echoed to all participants) or private (between 2 participants).

Currently, application does not support Video conferencing and Desktop sharing features, however in coming releases these features are also being introduced.

Mobile Support

Recently, iOS version of PowWow365 has been released for iPhones and iPads. This online meeting application combines all the features of Communication and Collaboration (C&C) including VoIP calls, chat, file sharing, along with integrations with plethora of 3rd party SaaS applications such as Yammer, Salesforce, Chatter DropBox, Box, Asana, Podio and others. App is available for download at App Store.

References

Web conferencing
Groupware